Ontario OUT of DOORS (OOD) is a Canadian magazine focusing on recreational hunting, fishing and the outdoors in the province of Ontario. OOD is published 10 times per year and is owned by the Ontario Federation of Anglers and Hunters (OFAH).

Mission 

Ontario's anglers and hunters will find the best where-to, how-to, and new product information in each issue of Ontario OUT OF DOORS. Expertly written and featuring outstanding photography, Canada's best read outdoors magazine delivers fishing and hunting content that informs, inspires, and entertains readers.

History
OOD was founded in 1967 under the title Ontario Fisherman and Hunter. In 1977, the magazine was renamed to its current title. In 1985, OOD was acquired by MacLean-Hunter Limited. Rogers Publishing took over the magazine in 1994 when it bought MacLean-Hunter. In 2009, the OFAH bought the magazine from Rogers.

Departments
From the Editor
Your Forum
The Opener
News
DIY 
Tips
Gear 
Memory Bank (reader-submitted photos memorializing their experiences in the outdoors, entered for a chance to win a prize) 
Q&A 
Cooking
Open Range
Fishing Columns 
Hunting Columns
Features
Travel 
Marketplace (classifieds)
My Outdoors (humour)

Online 
Ontario Out of Doors is available in print and in an enhanced digital version, featuring links to related videos, podcasts, and photo galleries.

OOD hosts an online forum which receives hundreds of thousands of page views monthly.

References

External links
 

Sports magazines published in Canada
Monthly magazines published in Canada
Magazines established in 1967
Magazines published in Ontario
Mass media in Peterborough, Ontario